Louise McKinney Riverfront Park or Louise McKinney Park is a municipal park in Edmonton, Alberta, Canada, that is part of the North Saskatchewan River valley parks system, and serves as the gateway park, with paved paths leading from it to everywhere in the parks system. The Cloverdale Pedestrian Bridge crossed the North Saskatchewan River connecting Louise McKinney Park to the Henrietta Muir Edwards Park and the Edmonton Queen attraction. The park is the closest to the downtown Edmonton area. The park also serves as a link in the trans-Canadian trail system.

Features 

 Boating: A public dock for canoes and other small boats is located at the riverfront part of the park.
 Garden: A Chinese garden is located in the park, the garden features a scenic path.
 Gazebo: A gazebo with an electrical outlet is located in the Chinese Garden. It is open for public booking.
 Promenade: A shelter-house is located on the riverfront park promenade sporting a public washroom along several other amenities.

References 

Parks in Edmonton